Exaeretia is a moth genus of the superfamily Gelechioidea. It is placed in the family Depressariidae, which is often – particularly in older treatments – considered a subfamily of Oecophoridae or included in the Elachistidae.

Selected species
Exaeretia allisella Stainton, 1849
Exaeretia ammitis (Meyrick, 1931)
Exaeretia amurella Lvovsky, 1990
Exaeretia ascetica (Meyrick, 1926)
Exaeretia boreella Lvovsky, 1990
Exaeretia bignatha S.X. Wang & Z. Zheng, 1998
Exaeretia buvati J. Nel, 2014
Exaeretia canella Busck, 1904
Exaeretia ciniflonella (Lienig & Zeller, 1846)
Exaeretia concaviuscula S.X. Wang, 2005
Exaeretia conciliatella (Rebel, 1892)
Exaeretia crassispina S.X. Wang, 2005
Exaeretia culcitella (Herrich-Schaffer, 1854)
Exaeretia daurella Lvovsky, 1998
Exaeretia deltata S.X. Wang, 2005
Exaeretia exornata S.X. Wang & Z. Zheng, 1998
Exaeretia fulvus Walsingham, 1882
Exaeretia fuscicostella (Christoph, 1887)
Exaeretia fuscogriseella Hannemann, 1990
Exaeretia gracilis Walsingham, 1889
Exaeretia hermophila (Meyrick, 1922)
Exaeretia hildaella Clarke, 1941
Exaeretia indubitatella (Hannemann, 1971)
Exaeretia kozhantshikovi Lvovsky, 2013
Exaeretia ledereri (Zeller, 1854)
Exaeretia lepidella (Christoph, 1872)
Exaeretia liupanshana S.X. Wang, in Liu & Wang, 2010
Exaeretia longifolia S.X. Wang, 2005
Exaeretia lusciosa (Meyrick, 1915)
Exaeretia lutosella (Herrich-Schaffer, 1854)
Exaeretia magnignatha S.X. Wang & Z. Zheng, 1998
Exaeretia mesosceptra (Meyrick, 1915)
Exaeretia mongolicella (Christoph, 1882)
Exaeretia montuesellus (Hannemann, 1976)
Exaeretia nebulosella (Caradja, 1920)
Exaeretia nechlys Hodges, 1975
Exaeretia nigromaculata Hannemann, 1989
Exaeretia nivalis Braun, 1921
Exaeretia niviferella (Christoph, 1872)
Exaeretia praeustella (Rebel, 1917)
Exaeretia preisseckeri (Rebel, 1937)
Exaeretia qinghaiana S.X. Wang & Zheng, 1996
Exaeretia relegata (Meyrick, 1920)
Exaeretia remotella (Hannemann, 1971)
Exaeretia scabella Zeller, 1873
Exaeretia significa (Meyrick, 1915)
Exaeretia sordidella Clarke, 1941
Exaeretia sutschanensis (Hannemann, 1953)
Exaeretia thoracefasciella Chambers, 1875
Exaeretia thoracenigraeella Chambers, 1875
Exaeretia umbraticostella Walsingham, 1881
Exaeretia vladimiri Lvovsky, 1984

Footnotes

References
  (2009): Exaeretia. Version 2.1, 2009-DEC-22. Retrieved 2012-JAN-24.
  (2004): Butterflies and Moths of the World, Generic Names and their Type-species – Exaeretia. Version of 2004-NOV-05. Retrieved 2012-JAN-24.
  (2010): Markku Savela's Lepidoptera and some other life forms – Exaeretia. Version of 2003-DEC-29. Retrieved 2012-JAN-24.
 , 1990: Neue Depressarien (Lepidoptera: Oecophoridae). Deutsche Entomologische Zeitschrift 37 (1-3): 137–144. Abstract: .
 ;  2010: One new species and three newly recorded species of the genus Exaeretia Stainton, 1849 (Lepidoptera: Elachistidae: Depressariinae) from China. Zootaxa, 2444: 45–50. Preview
 , 1849, Trans. Ent. Soc. London (1) 5: 152.
 , 2005, A review of the genus Exaeretia from China, with descriptions of four new species (Lepidoptera: Depressariidae), Oriental Insects 39: 147-155.

 
Depressariinae
Moth genera